Pencak Silat at the 2009 Southeast Asian Games was held at Hall 3, Lao international Trade Exhibition and Convention Center, Vientiane, Laos between December 12 and 17, 2009.

Medal summary

Medalists
The results of individual competitions at the games are as follows:

Artistic

Tarung

Men

Women

References

External links
 Games Result System: Official Result of the 25th Southeast Asian Games Vientiane 2009

2009 Southeast Asian Games events
2009